The Vacant Lot is a short-lived sketch comedy show starring the comedy group of the same name, which CBC Television ran for only six episodes starting in December 1993. The Vacant Lot was originally extended for another 13 episodes, which were scripted but never filmed when new president of the CBC Perrin Beatty wanted to phase out of edgy comedy programs in favor of lighter fare such as This Hour Has 22 Minutes. The show was primarily directed by Rob Quartly and executive producers were Lorne Michaels, Pam Thomas and Jim Biederman, all of whom were producers of CBC's The Kids in the Hall (in which the members appeared on as extras from time to time).

Unlike The Kids in the Hall, The Vacant Lot consists of filmed sketches that were screened to a studio audience. The show would also have a musical piece each episode and did not have recurring characters.

CBC sold the show to Comedy Central, which did not air the episodes until July 1994. The Vacant Lot was shown as a Fourth of July marathon on that network.

Nick McKinney, a member of The Vacant Lot, is the brother of The Kids in the Hall member and Saturday Night Live veteran Mark McKinney. The show's other cast members were Rob Gfroerer, Vito Viscomi, and Paul Greenberg, where they originally started as a trio until they met McKinney who they met at a party.

The Vacant Lot opening theme music was "Pretty Vacant" by The Sex Pistols.

Episode list

References

External links

CBC Television original programming
1990s Canadian sketch comedy television series
1993 Canadian television series debuts
1993 Canadian television series endings